Darwinia nubigena, commonly known as success bell or red mountain bell, is a species of flowering plant in the family Myrtaceae and is endemic to the south of Western Australia. It is an erect shrub with egg-shaped leaves arranged in opposite pairs, and groups of 4 or 5 pendent red flowers surrounded by larger green and red bracts.

Description
Flowering occurs from September to November.

Taxonomy
Darwinia nubigena was first formally described in 2009 by Gregory John Keighery in the journal Nuytsia from specimens collected in the Stirling Range National Park in 1997. The specific epithet (nubigena) means "born of the clouds".

Distribution and habitat
Success bell is confined to a small area on a saddle on a mountain in the centre of the eastern part of Stirling Range National Park where it grows in dense, montane mallee shrubland. There is a single population comprising around 10,000 individuals. The area was burnt in April 1991 but has regenerated strongly from seed with up to 100 seedlings per square metre.

Conservation status
This darwinia is listed as "vulnerable" under the Australian Government Environment Protection and Biodiversity Conservation Act 1999 and as "Threatened" by the Western Australian Government Department of Biodiversity, Conservation and Attractions, meaning that it is in danger of extinction. The main threats to the species are inappropriate fire regimes and dieback caused by Phytophthora cinnamomi.

References

nubigena
Endemic flora of Western Australia
Vulnerable flora of Australia
Myrtales of Australia
Rosids of Western Australia
Plants described in 2009
Taxa named by Gregory John Keighery